Metascope Records (pronounced [mɛtə skəʊp ˈrɛkɔːdz]) is a Polish independent record label, created in 2015 It is headquartered in London, United Kingdom with main production facility in Tienen, Belgium and the commercial office in Warsaw, Poland.

Metascope Records releases POP and EDM artists globally.

References

Pop record labels
Polish record labels
Belgian record labels
Electronic music record labels
Polish independent record labels